Chester railway station is located in Newtown, Chester, England. Services are operated by Avanti West Coast, Merseyrail, Northern and Transport for Wales. From 1875 to 1969 the station was known as Chester General to distinguish it from Chester Northgate. The station's Italianate frontage was designed by the architect Francis Thompson.

Work on a £10 million regeneration scheme, the Chester Renaissance programme was completed in 2007. The development includes a new roof, improved customer facilities and improved access to the station. A plaque commemorating Thomas Brassey is installed on the wall opposite the booking office. The station marks one end of the Baker Way a footpath leading to Delamere railway station.

Scheduled services from Chester station are operated by Avanti West Coast to London Euston and Holyhead, Merseyrail to Liverpool, Northern to Manchester Piccadilly and Leeds and Transport for Wales to Liverpool Lime Street, Manchester Airport, Crewe, Birmingham New Street, Cardiff Central, Llandudno and Holyhead.

History

Background and construction
On 23 September 1840, the first station at Chester was opened by the Chester and Birkenhead Railway (CBR). One week later, on 1 October 1840, the Grand Junction Railway (GJR) opened a separate station. Neither station was open for long, due to the inconvenience of transferring goods and passengers between them. They were replaced by the new joint station at the junction between the CBR, GJR and Robert Stephenson's new Chester and Holyhead Railway (CHR) which started at the joint station. The station was designed by the architect Francis Thompson, and constructed by Thomas Brassey. The engineer C. H. Wild designed the train shed. Elements of the overall design were produced by other engineers, including Stephenson.

On 1 August 1847, construction of the station began, the foundation stone was laid by Brassey. It was built by a workforce of around 2,000 people, including bricklayers, stonemasons, carpenters, roofers, plumbers and other skilled and unskilled workers. On 1 August 1848, Chester Station was officially opened, exactly a year after construction began. The opening was met with great acclaim amongst the city's populace due to the wide range of destinations that could be reached for the first time.

The station building is built of Staffordshire blue brick and pale grey Storeton sandstone with slate roofs in the Italianate style. It has a 305-metre two-storey façade with a 15-bay central section and 5-bay lateral projecting pavilions, each of which have two towers. A large clock, manufactured by J. B. Joyce & Co on the front of the station was originally located centrally, but was moved to the western half of the facade following the construction of the Queen Hotel, which obscured it. The central section's middle seven bays contain carvings by sculptor John Thomas. Several carved wooden owls occupy locations in the roof beams above platform 4 to deter feral pigeons from roosting.

As first built, the station had a single through platform, a pair of bay platforms, and the main building. Early on, it became highly trafficked, partially due to its position as a junction between multiple lines and railway companies. In its first few decades of opening, it was expanded via the construction of sidings, warehouses, signalboxes and two motive power depots to service steam locomotives that belonged to different railway companies. To accommodate the increasing number of passengers and freight in the 1860s and 1870s, the station was extended again. Two island platforms, two bay platforms, and additional facilities connected via a footbridge to the existing station were completed by 1890.

Operations

From its opening on 1 August 1848, Chester was a joint station used by the Chester and Holyhead, Grand Junction, the Shrewsbury and Chester Railway and the Chester and Birkenhead Railways. The C&HR and GJR merged with other companies to form the London and North Western Railway (LNWR). In 1850 the Birkenhead, Lancashire and Cheshire Junction Railway built a line from Chester to near Warrington, later absorbing the C&BR. The S&CR was later merged with others into the Great Western Railway (GWR). The LNWR and the GWR later acquired the BL&CJR jointly.

Chester Station was served by GWR express passenger trains (and subsequently by the Western Region of British Railways) from Birkenhead Woodside via Chester, Wrexham, Ruabon, Gobowen, Shrewsbury, Wellington (Shropshire), Wolverhampton, Birmingham Snow Hill, Leamington Spa and Banbury to London Paddington until 4 March 1967. The final service, a special The Zulu, was hauled by 7029 Clun Castle.

During 1875, Chester Northgate railway station was opened by the Cheshire Lines Committee. To prevent confusion between the stations, the older station was renamed "Chester General". In 1969, as a result of the Beeching cuts, Chester Northgate was closed and Chester General reverted to Chester.

Peak activity was during the Edwardian era when more than 200 trains called at the station daily and more than one hundred staff were employed. Large quantities of freight were also moved, including the Royal Mail's letters and parcels business. Special excursion trains were laid on for Chester Races. During the First World War, troop trains  used the station when moving military personnel from training camps in North Wales to the Western Front.

During the interwar period, the station was busy, only slightly affected by the rise of road transportation. Trams, and later buses linked the station to the city and its suburbs. During the Second World War, the station saw a high volume of traffic, including trains hauling ammunition. It survived the conflict unscathed, sustaining no direct hits but to mitigate against aerial attacks, a concrete bunker was built to house signalling equipment.

In January 2016, according to the Office of Rail and Road, passenger numbers doubled over the previous ten years, making Chester the eighth-busiest station in the North-West region. The rise was attributed to new services, such as direct trains to London and increased frequencies on the Merseyrail network.

Starting in 2005, the station was restored in the Chester Renaissance Project. Improvements made by Network Rail included groundworks around the east end frontage and repairs to the façade's east and west wings, renewal of the roof's glazing, enhancements to the train shed and other general improvements. Improved local traffic management and access to the station was achieved by alterations to Station Square which were completed in December 2007. Architectural lighting was installed in strategic areas and a new concourse was opened by Arriva Trains Wales in October 2008. Between 2009 and 2010, improvements included a second staircase to access the island platform, structural repairs to platforms, restoration of the overbridge and work to enhance the station's frontage.

The station is recorded in the National Heritage List for England as a Grade II* listed building. It is one of 22 Grade I or II* listed railway stations in England. A plaque commemorating Thomas Brassey was installed on the wall opposite the  booking office.

Extensions and redoubling initiatives
In 1993, an extension to the Wirral Line received third rail electrification on existing track and Chester became its terminus. Its trains use Platform 7 the only one with access to the third rail. The line provides frequent rapid access to the Wirral, Birkenhead and all four underground stations in central Liverpool. The historic Chester and Birkenhead Railway, the first railway to serve Chester, became a part of Merseyrail's Wirral Line.

In April 2017, Network Rail and contractors completed the redoubling of the Wrexham to Chester line enabling increased line speeds up to 90 mph on certain sections. When the work was completed, there were no plans to increase speeds or introduce new services until late 2017 at the earliest.

Halton Curve reopening
In 2014, George Osborne announced funding to finance the Halton Curve's redevelopment to permit services between Liverpool and North Wales via  and Chester. The 30-year plan for the curve included connections to South Wales. The services started running in May 2019 and now provide Chester with a direct link to Liverpool Airport and an alternative route to central Liverpool.

Stationmasters

William Paget ca. 1847
Mr. Jones ca. 1849
John Critchley ca. 1850–1855 (afterwards superintendent of the Oxford, Worcester and Wolverhampton Railway)
Charles Mills ca. 1859–1872
David Meldrum 1872–1882
W. Thorne 1882–1890 (formerly station master at Hereford Barrs Court)
John Thomas Reddish 1890–1902
W.G. Marrs 1903–1909
John Ratcliffe 1910–1926
Robert McNaught 1926–1932
Lewis Evans 1932  1934
A.E. Mawson 1934–1942 (formerly station master at Woodside)
John Moore 1943–1950 (formerly station master at Birkenhead Dock)
Percy Jackson 1950–1955
Eric L Thompson 1955–1963 (formerly station master at Bedford)
Kenneth Conyers Winterton 1963–1964
Mr. Mapstone ca. 1967 ca. 1969

Services 

Platform 3
 1 train per hour operated by Transport for Wales to Llandudno (via Llandudno Junction).
 1 train per hour operated by Transport for Wales to Holyhead (via Bangor).
 1 train per hour operated by Transport for Wales to Wrexham General and Shrewsbury of which one every two hours continues to Cardiff Central and one every two hours continues to Birmingham International.
 Y Gerallt Gymro, a Monday to Friday daily limited-stop express north to Holyhead operated by Transport for Wales.
 Occasional services from Crewe operated by Avanti West Coast and terminating at Chester or Holyhead or Bangor.

Platform 4
 1 train per hour operated by Avanti West Coast to London Euston via Crewe and Milton Keynes Central.
 1 train per hour operated by Transport for Wales to Manchester Airport (via ).
 1 train per hour operated by Transport for Wales to Liverpool Lime Street via Runcorn using the Halton Curve.
 Y Gerallt Gymro, a Monday to Friday daily limited-stop express south to  operated by Transport for Wales.
 Occasional services to Crewe operated by Avanti West Coast and starting at Chester or Holyhead or Bangor.

Platforms 5/6

 1tph on the Mid-Cheshire Line to Manchester Piccadilly and Stockport via Northwich operated by Northern Trains. A 2-hourly service operates on Sundays.

Platform 7

 4 trains per hour operated by Merseyrail to the Liverpool Central Loop via Birkenhead during peak times on weekdays and Saturdays. Late evenings and Sundays the frequency is every 30 minutes. Merseyrail services to Birkenhead and Liverpool use Platform 7b or 7a, Platform 7 is the only third-rail equipped platform. These services are provided by Class 507 and Class 508 EMUs.

Table of services

Future

Northern Franchise Requirements
Under the Northern franchise, Arriva Rail North (branded 'Northern') must fulfil the following requirements:

 From December 2017, an extra hourly train from Chester to Leeds, via Warrington Bank Quay, Newton-le-Willows, Manchester Victoria and then either Dewsbury or Bradford (via the Calder Valley) operated by new 100 mph diesel trains from 2019.
 On the Manchester Piccadilly to Chester via Northwich line, Sunday services will operate hourly in both directions (up from two hourly).
 The franchise requires the removal and replacement of all Pacer trains by 2020.

The Chester to Leeds route via Manchester Victoria was finally introduced on 20 May 2019, eighteen months later than initially planned.

Layout and facilities
The station has seven platforms. Platform 1 is a bay platform located at the east end (a second one alongside it is no longer utilised for passenger traffic but can be used for stock stabling). Platform 2 at the western end is another bay platform. Platform 3 is a through bi-directional platform and is closest to the concourse; it is split into sections 3a and 3b although on occasions a train will use the middle of the platform.

Over the bridge – or by way of lifts – is the island platform. Opposite Platform 3 is Platform 4, another through bi-directional platform, with sections designated as 4a and 4b. There are two east facing bays (Platforms 5 and 6). Platform 7 is an additional through platform, the only one with third-rail electrification; it is split into 'a' (eastern) and 'b' (western) sections and thus capable of accommodating two trains at once.

The station has a booking office and is staffed 15 minutes before and after the first and last train. There is a payphone, vending machine, booking office and live departure and arrival screens, for passenger information. The station has lifts and is fully accessible for disabled users. There is a car park with 83 spaces and cycle racks for 68 cycles.

Accidents
 On 4 July 1949, a Derby to Llandudno passenger train ran into the rear of a Crewe to Holyhead passenger service, resulting in fifty injured people.
 Chester General rail crash: On 8 May 1972, a freight train suffered a brake failure and collided with a diesel multiple unit at Chester General station and caught fire, causing severe damage to the building and the trains involved.
 On 20 November 2013, a Class 221 Super Voyager diesel-electric multiple unit from London Euston to Chester collided with the buffer stops on platform 1, riding up over them and smashing a glass screen. There were no injuries, although one passenger was taken to hospital for checks. A Rail Accident Investigation Branch report stated that the incident was due to exceptionally slippery rails, but that the consequences of this were made more severe by the buffer stop being of an older design, which did not absorb the impact energy effectively. The report further stated that that particular stop had not undergone a risk assessment within the previous ten years, and was possibly not appropriate for class 221 units.

See also

 Grade II* listed buildings in Cheshire West and Chester
 Chester TMD

References

Further reading
  – photo of station frontage

External links 

 Chester to Shrewsbury Rail Partnership
 ORR Station Usage Estimates

Buildings and structures in Chester
Railway stations in Cheshire
Former Birkenhead Railway stations
Railway stations in Great Britain opened in 1848
Grade II* listed buildings in Chester
Grade II* listed railway stations
Railway stations served by Merseyrail
Northern franchise railway stations
Railway stations served by Transport for Wales Rail
Railway stations served by Avanti West Coast
Francis Thompson railway stations
DfT Category B stations
Stations on the West Coast Main Line